İstanbul Büyükşehir Belediyesi S.K., shortly Istanbul BB SK or IBBSK,  is a multi-sports club of the metropolitan municipality of Istanbul in Turkey.

Branches
The club has following sport branches:
Volleyball (Arome Men's League),
Basketball,
Wrestling,
Karate,
Taekwondo,
Judo,
Table tennis,
Athletics and
Swimming.

Further, the club provides activities in scouting.

Notable members
International successful members of the club are:

Judo
Men's
Sezer Huysuz (−73 kg)
Hüseyin Özkan (−66 kg) – 2000 Olympic gold medalist

Women's
Büşra Katipoğlu (−63 kg)

Karate
Men's
Uğur Aktaş (kumite −84 kg) – 2017 European champion
Haldun Alagaş (kumite −70 kg)
Yusuf Başer (kumite open)
İlyas Demir (kumite −60 kg)
Zeki Demir (kumite −80 kg) – 2006 European champion
Enes Erkan (kumite −84 kg) – 2007 World junior, 2008 European junior, 2012, 2014 World, 2013, 2014 European, 2015 European Games champion
Yücel Gündoğdu (kumite −65 kg) – 2007 European champion
Ömer Kemaloğlu (kumite −65 kg) – 2008 European champion
Ali Sofuoğlu (kata)
Serkan Yağcı (kumite −75 kg)

Women's
Vildan Doğan (Kumite open)

Taekwondo
Men's
Bahri Tanrıkulu – 2004 Olympic silver medalist, multiple World and European champion, 2005 Universiade champion

Women's
Zeynep Murat – 2000 World Cup, 2004 European and 2005 Universiade champion
Kadriye Selimoğlu – 2001 World champion
Azize Tanrıkulu (63 kg) – 2005 European and 2005 Universiade champion
Hamide Bıkçın Tosun – 2000 Olympic bronze medalist and 1995 World champion

Wrestling
Freestyle
Adem Bereket (Freestyle) – 2000 Olympic bronze medalist
Soner Demirtaş (Freestyle -74 kg) – 2016, 2017 European and 2013 Mediterranean Games champion
Ramazan Şahin (Freestyle 66 kg) – 2008 Olympic gold medalist, 2007 World and 2008 European champion

Greco-Roman
Aslan Atem (Greco-Roman -80 kg)
Metehan Başar (Greco-Roman -85 kg)
Şeref Eroğlu (Greco-Roman) – 2004 Olympic silver medalist, 1997 World and multiple European champion
Mehmet Özal (Greco-Roman) –  2004 Olympic bronze medalist, 2002 World champion
Hamza Yerlikaya (Greco-Roman) – 1996 and 2000 Olympic gold medalist, multiple World, European and 1997 Mediterranean Games champion

Football

References

External links
http://www.istanbulbbsk.org/

Sport in Istanbul
Istanbul Büyükşehir Belediyespor
1990 establishments in Turkey
Sports clubs established in 1990